Club Atlético Quilmes (mostly known as Quilmes de Mar del Plata) is a sports club based in Mar del Plata, Buenos Aires Province, Argentina. Although other sports are practised in the club, Quilmes is mostly known for its basketball team, which currently plays in the Liga Nacional de Básquet, the top division of Argentine league system.

Other activities practised in Quilmes are dance, field hockey, football, gymnastics, martial arts and roller skating. Quilmes' arch-rival is Peñarol, from the same city.

History

Origins in football 
Quilmes was founded on April 12, 1922, by a group of young people who used to play football in some of the many unoccupied lands that existed in Mar del Plata in those times. They want to participate in competitions organised by "Asociación Marplatense de Foot-Ball" so they founded a club with the purpose of registering to the Association.

At the beginning those boys did not have a physical place for their meetings and because of that the Club Ferroviario (founded and integrated by employees of the Buenos Aires Great Southern Railway ("Ferrocarril Sud" in Spanish) allowed them to use their buildings. The raising club also was helped by people from the neighbourhood, who made their contributions. Furthermore, the most important donation was given by the legal representatives of beer company Quilmes in Mar del Plata, José Deyaccobi, who donated the club a set of uniform jerseys, which were equal to River Plate kit. That was the origin of the name and colours of the club.

Quilmes' first President was Eugenio Moure, who also composed the official anthem of the club along with the musicians Luis Duhalde and Francisco Mafia.

Like most of Argentine clubs, football was the first sport practised in Quilmes, which is considered a pioneer in the city. Moreover, Quilmes' stadium was the frequent host of all the matches played in Mar del Plata. At the beginning, Quilmes' headquarters were located on 25 de Mayo streets. A basketball court would be added later. The basketball section was added in the 1930s, winning its first title in 1947.

The first football venue was built where Moreno Park is located nowadays. In that venue Quilmes played a friendly match v. Santos FC with Pelé as an outstanding host of the city, in the 1960s. The football squad also took part in the 1970 Copa Argentina, being eliminated by Argentinos Juniors (1–4 on aggregate).

In 1983, Quilmes played the "Torneo Regional", after qualifying in a group with Alvarado, Peñarol and C.D. Nicanor Otamendi, but the team was eliminated in first round. The last Quilmes' participation was in the 1996–97 Torneo Argentino B. After qualifying for the second stage, Quilmes was finally eliminated by Sporting (Punta Alta) and Empleados de Comercio (Bolívar).

Basketball 
In 1944, Quilmes affiliated to "Asociación Marplatense de Básquetbol", entering to the second division. The club won the championship that same season, therefore promoting to the first level, "Primera División". In 1947 Quilmes won its first title at the top level of "Marplatense" basketball. The team has won that championship a total of 23 times to date.

In 1987 Quilmes participated in their first national competition, the LNB "C" (third division), where the squad defeated Regatas (San Nicolás) crowning champion and promoting to "Liga Nacional B". After several years playing in that division, Quilmes won the 1990–91 title, promoting to the LNB "A" after defeating Pico Fútbol Club by 101–91. Coached by Oscar Sánchez, the players that took part of the team were Sebastián Ginóbili, Eduardo Dominé, Leandro Ginóbili, Alejandro Alegretti, Fabián Crivaro, Adolfo Perazzo, Michael Wilson, Mario Romay, Javier Bianchini, Juan Pablo Vignolo, Santiago Cuñado and Adrián Martínez.

Quilmes debuted in the LNB in September 1991 v. arch-rival Peñarol, winning the game by 72–69.

Players

Current roster

Retired numbers

Statistics
Note: Statistics are correct as of the end of the 2013–14 season.

Titles

National
 Torneo Nacional de Ascenso (3): 1991, 1999, 2011

Regional
 Liga Marplatense (23): 1947, 1949, 1950, 1951, 1953, 1954, 1955, 1958, 1961, 1964, 1966, 1967, 1968, 1970, 1972, 1973, 1974, 1976, 1985, 1987, 1991, 1995, 1996

References

External links

  
Unofficial website 
Soy Cervecero

Basketball teams in Buenos Aires Province
Basketball teams established in 1922
Football clubs in Buenos Aires Province